Bodianus sanguineus, the sunrise wrasse, is a species of wrasse. 
It is found in Hawaii.

Size

References

sanguineus
Fish of the Pacific Ocean

Taxa named by David Starr Jordan
Taxa named by Barton Warren Evermann
Fish described in 1903